Hemsworth and South Kirkby railway station served the towns of Hemsworth and South Kirkby, in the historical county of West Riding of Yorkshire, England, from 1891 to 1932 on the Hull and Barnsley Railway.

History 
The station was opened on 1 July 1891 by the Hull, Barnsley and West Riding Junction Railway and Dock Company. It closed on 1 January 1932 but an excursion ran on 14 October 1933 for Hull Civic Week. This ran every October until 1939.

References 

Disused railway stations in West Yorkshire
Railway stations in Great Britain opened in 1891
Railway stations in Great Britain closed in 1932
1891 establishments in England
1932 disestablishments in England
Former Hull and Barnsley Railway stations